Maclay's Mill is the former site of a grist mill located approximately  from Shippensburg, Pennsylvania along the Conodoguinet Creek.

History
Maclay's Mill was built along the area near the Conodoguinet Creek which was first settled in 1742 by Charles Maclay, Sr., who had arrived in America eight years prior. The mill was built around 1786 by Charles' son John Maclay. Although there is controversy as to the date, one family narrative includes a legend that the mill race leading to John Maclay's grist mill was dug by Hessian prisoners of war during the American Revolution. The mill lasted seven generations until it was dismantled in 1918 after being sold to Clarence Stouffer. Over its lifetime the mill was the childhood home of two United States Senators, William Maclay (politician) and Samuel Maclay, this also being the birthplace of the latter of the two.

See also
McClay's Twin Bridge (East)
McClay's Twin Bridge (West)

References

External links
 Samuel Maclay
 Political Graveyard Biographies
 William Maclay

1918 disestablishments in Pennsylvania
Grinding mills in Pennsylvania
Agricultural buildings and structures in Pennsylvania
Industrial buildings completed in 1786